Carne-de-sol (locally , Portuguese for "sun meat"), or jabá is a dish from Northeastern Brazil. It consists of heavily salted beef, which is exposed to the sun for one or two days to cure.

Carne-de-sol is sometimes fried and served as a hamburger, or baked in the oven with cream or, more traditionally, prepared as savory paçoca.

Its origin is attributed to the sertanejos (people who live in the semi-arid countryside), who developed this local recipe to preserve meat. Nowadays, the dish is traditional and typical of the entire Northeast Region of Brazil, and is served in restaurants all across the country.

See also
Charque
Bresaola
Dried meat
List of Brazilian dishes
 List of dried foods
 

Brazilian cuisine
Beef dishes
Dried meat